Monique Polak (born May 20, 1960) is a writer from Montreal, Quebec. She has won the Janet Savage Blachford Prize, formally known as the Quebec Writer's Foundation Prize for Children's and Young Adult Literature, three times: What World is Left (2009), Hate Mail (2014), and Room for One More (2020).

Personal life and education
Polak was born May 20, 1960, in Montreal to Mazilmilien, a criminal court judge, and Celina, a homemaker, Polak. Celina survived the Holocaust, as did her two brothers and both parents. Mezilmilien survived the Holocaust because he was a painter in Holland and was forced to do propaganda art for the Nazis. Polak also has a sister named  Carolyn.

She married Chaim Melamed December 16, 1979, and the couple have a daughter named Alicia. They divorced in 1985. She married Michael Shenker, a journalist, on June 2, 1996. 

Polak received a Bachelor of Arts in English literature from McGill University in 1981, and a Master of Arts in English literature from Concordia University. 

Polak in Jewish.

Career 
In 1987, Polak began teaching in English and humanities at Marianopolis College, where she has worked since. 

She is also a freelance journalist. Her articles appear regularly in The Montreal Gazette and other Postmedia newspapers across the country. Several of her feature stories have also been published in Maclean's Magazine.

In 2015, Polak was named the inaugural CBC/QWF Montreal writer-in-residence.

Awards and honours

Publications

Novels 

 Flip Turn (James Lorimer, 2004)
 No More Pranks (Orca, 2004)
 On the Game (James Lorimer, 2005)
 Home Invasion (Orca, 2005)
 All In (James Lorimer, 2006)
 Finding Elmo (Orca, 2007)
 Scarred (James Lorimer, 2007)
 121 Express (Orca, 2008)
 What World Is Left (Orca, 2008)
 The Middle of Everywhere (Orca, 2009)
 Junkyard Dog (Orca, 2009)
 Miracleville (Orca, 2011)
 Pyro (Orca, 2012)
 So Much It Hurts (Orca, 2013)
 Straight Punch (Orca, 2014)
 Hate Mail (Orca, 2014)
 Learning the Ropes (Orca, 2015)
 Forensics Squad Unleashed (Orca, 2016)
 Leggings Revolt (Orca 2016)
 Bullies Rule Orca, 2017)
 Princess Angelica, Camp Catastrophe, illustrated by Jane Heinrichs (Orca, 2018)
 Planet Grief (Orca, 2018) 
 Princess Angelica, Part-Time Lion Trainer, illustrated by Jane Heinrichs (Orca, 2019)
 The Taste of Rain (Orca, 2019)
 Room for One More (Kar-Ben, 2019)
 Princess Angelica, Junior Reporter, illustrated by  Jane Heinrich (Orca, 2020) 
 For the Record (Owlkids, 2022)

Nonfiction 

 Passover: Festival of Freedom (Orca, 2016)
 I Am a Feminist: Claiming the F-Word in Turbulent Times (Orca, 2019)
 Why Humans Work: How Jobs Shape Our Lives and Our World, illustraed by Suharu Ogawa (Orca, 2022)
 Passover Family (Orca, 2018)
 The Brass Charm, illustrated by Marie Lafrance (Scholastic, 2022)

References

External links
Monique Polak at Quebec Writers' Federation Literary Database of Quebec English-Language authors
Write On Montreal: Monique Polak, Montreal Gazette, Aug. 20, 2013
Mom's fine, Dad's an absolute mess, Maclean's Magazine, Sept. 3, 2009
Behrens uses evocative details to take readers on a journey by Monique Polak, Vancouver Sun, June 22, 2013
Official website

Canadian women novelists
20th-century Canadian novelists
21st-century Canadian novelists
Canadian writers of young adult literature
Writers from Montreal
Living people
20th-century Canadian women writers
21st-century Canadian women writers
Women writers of young adult literature
Year of birth missing (living people)